The Ferrovie della Sardegna (Railways of Sardinia), known also as ARST Gestione FdS between 2008 and 2010 and with the abbreviation FdS, was an Italian public company that managed the regional railway network in the island of Sardinia, Italy. In 2010 it was totally integrated with the main regional public transport company, ARST (Azienda Regionale Sarda Trasporti).

It was the second railway operator in Sardinia, after Ferrovie dello Stato, having 203 kilometers of railways used for public transport, plus another four tourist lines, known as Trenino Verde, which run through the wildest parts of the island.

The company was founded in 1989. It is a narrow gauge railway system, using diesel locomotives and multiple units, electrified tram-trains in the metropolitan areas of Sassari and Cagliari and vintage diesel and steam locomotives on the tourist lines.

Today works are in progress to modernise several lines with the electrification of routes around the metropolitan areas of Sassari and Cagliari.

Lines

Public Transport Lines

Line Macomer-Tirso-Nuoro
Line Sassari-Sorso (work is in progress converting the line to a light rail transit)
Line Sassari-Alghero (planned conversion to light rail transit)
Line Monserrato-Isili
Metro-tramway of Sassari
Metro-tramway of Cagliari

Tourist Lines (Trenino Verde)
''
Line Macomer-Bosa
Line Sassari-Nulvi-Tempio Pausania-Luras-Palau
Line Mandas-Gairo-Arbatax
Line Mandas-Isili-Sorgono

Dismantled Lines

Line Siliqua-San Giovanni Suergiu-Calasetta (Ferrovie Meridionali Sarde)
Line Iglesias-Monteponi-San Giovanni Suergiu  (Ferrovie Meridionali Sarde)
Line Gairo-Jerzu
Line Isili-Villamar-Villacidro
Line Villamar-Ales
Line Tirso-Ozieri
Line Luras-Monti

Gallery

See also
Sassari Tram-train
 Cagliari Metro-tramway

References

Transport in Sardinia
Railway companies of Italy
950 mm gauge railways in Italy
Railway companies established in 1989
Railway companies disestablished in 2010